Viktor Yakovlevich Drobysh (born June 27, 1966, Leningrad, Russian SFSR) is a Russian composer and music producer, Honored Artist of Russia (2010).

Song Author group Buranovskiye Babushki Party for Everybody, who took 2nd place at Eurovision 2012.

From 1996 he worked in Germany. After working in Germany, Drobysh moved to Finland, where he created the duet Pets.

In 2004, Drobysh participated as a co-producer in the talent show Fabrika Zvyozd of Channel One Russia. In 2006, he single-handedly led the 6th season of the project.

In August 2004, Viktor Drobysh's Producer Centre was created. It was engaged in promoting the groups Tootsie, K.G.B., Chelsea, Princessa Avenue and Ultrafiolet, as well as solo artists, such as Yulia Mikhalchik, Natalia Podolskaya, Stas Piekha, Dmitry Koldun, Zara, Avraam Russo, Sogdiana Fedorinskaya, Prokhor Chaliapin and others.

References

External links
 Витя Дробыш и Кач

1966 births
Living people
Russian composers
Russian male composers
Soviet composers
Soviet male composers
Russian record producers
Recipients of the Order of Francysk Skaryna
Honored Artists of the Russian Federation
Fabrika Zvyozd
Russian keyboardists
Russian expatriates in Finland
20th-century Russian male musicians